Puding County is a county in west-central Guizhou province, China. It is under the administration of the prefecture-level city of Anshun.

Etymology
The name "Puding" can be traced back to the Mongolian-rule Yuan dynasty (1271–1368)，when in 1257, after the Mongolian army went to conquest southwest China, the imperial court set up a "Fu" named "Puding" in the area.

History
In the 3rd century BC, Puding County (Puding) was a part of an ancient political entity Yelang.

After the Tang Empire conquered Guizhou, a county named "Shi'an" was set up and it came under the jurisdiction of Yan Zhou, which symboled this land was formally annexed to the Tang Empire. In 755, the An Lushan Rebellion broke out, then the past decades of internal fighting had weakened the Tang Empire. Puding broke away from the rule of the Tang Empire. The native tribes founded the Luodian Kingdom.

In the Five Dynasties and Ten Kingdoms period (907–960), it belonged to Shi'an County, part of which was owned by Wangjiang county.

In 1257, the Mongols occupied Puding and established Puding Prefecture and it came under the administration of Qujing Xuanweisi. In 1351, Puding County was separated from Puding Prefecture.

In 1381, in the ruling of Hongwu Emperor (1368–1398) of the Ming dynasty (1368–1644), Puding Castle was founded and it came under the jurisdiction of Sichuan Dusi. In 1438, in the 3rd year of Zhengtong era (1436–1449), Puding County was under the administration of Guizhou Dusi.

During the reign of Kangxi Emperor of the Qing dynasty (1644–1911), Puding County belonged to Anshun Prefecture.

After the establishment of the Republic of China in 1912, Puding County was briefly revoked but immediately restored in the following year. In 1914, some areas of Anshun, Zhenning, Langdai, Zhijin and Pingba were merged into Puding County. In 1935, Puding County came under the jurisdiction of the (Anshun) Second Administrative Supervision Region. Three years later, it came under the jurisdiction of the (Xingren) Third Administrative Supervision Region.

In 1949, Guizhou was liberated by the People's Liberation Army. Puding County came under the jurisdiction of Anshun Zhuanqu (now Anshun).

Administrative divisions
After an adjustment of township-level administrative divisions of Puding County on January 29, 2016, the county has three subdistricts, six towns and three ethnic townships under its jurisdiction. In July 2019, Yuxiu Subdistrict was separated from Chuandong Subdistrict.

Geography
Puding County is located in west-central Guizhou province. It shares a border with Liuzhi Special District to the west, Xixiu District, Pingba District and Anshun Economic and Technological Development Zone to the east, Zhijin County to the north, and Zhenning Buyei and Miao Autonomous County and Liuzhi Special District to the south.

Geology
The terrain of Puding County is high in the south and north and low in the middle. Karst landforms are widely distributed in Puding County.

Climate
The climate is mild throughout the year, without severe cold in winter and hot in summer.

Rivers
Sancha River is the largest river in Puding County and Boyu River is the second largest river in the county. Dabang River rises in southern Puding County.

Lakes and reservoirs

Demographics

Population
As of 2017, Puding County had a population of 505,400. The total number of permanent residents in Puding County is 392,800, the birth rate is 12.95 ‰, the mortality rate is 5.14 ‰, and the natural population growth rate is 7.81 ‰. The Han is about 80% of the total population of Puding County, and Miao and Bouyei are the main ethnic minorities in the county.

Language
Mandarin is the official language. The local people speak both Southwestern Mandarin and minority language.

Religion
The county government supports all religions. The local people mainly believe in Buddhism and Catholicism.

Education
The main high schools and middle schools are:
Puding County No. 1 High School
Puding County No. 2 High School
Machang Middle School
Maguan Middle School
Longchang Middle School
Baiyan Middle School
Bulang Middle School
Houchang Middle School
Pingshang Middle School
Huachu Middle School
Maodong Middle School
Jichang Middle School

Transport

Expressway
S55 Chiwang Expressway runs north to south through the downtown Puding County and then to heads west to Anshun city.

Provincial Highway S209 travels through central Puding County and intersects with S55 Anshunxi Ring Expressway in the town of Baiyan.

Railway
Puding railway station serves the county.

Notable people
, politician.

, sculptor and painter of Chinese painting.

Liu Gangji, professor at Wuhan University.

, professor at Guizhou University.

Yuan Xikun, sculptor and painter.

References

External links

 
County-level divisions of Guizhou